I'm a Killer is a 2016 Polish crime film directed by Maciej Pieprzyca. It is based on the case of the serial killer Zdzisław Marchwicki.

Plot 
The main character of the film, Janusz Jasiński, is a young lieutenant of the Citizens' Militia. As the investigation into the female serial killer is at a standstill so far, Jasinski is appointed the new head of the investigation group. He tries to do everything to seize a life chance and catch a serial killer. After a circumstantial investigation, under the pressure of his superiors, he indicates a suspect in the person of Wiesław Kalicki, who still does not plead guilty. As the trial progresses, Jasiński basked in fame, ignoring testimony that could provide evidence pointing to a possible real murderer. Jasiński's opportunism triumphs over his doubts, and Kalicki is sentenced to death. Soon Jasiński's professional career and personal life collapse. In the last scene, Jasiński attends an exhibition showing the cast face of Kalicki; the reflection of the policeman on the site merges with the image of the alleged murderer.

Cast 
 Mirosław Haniszewski as Janusz Jasiński, a determined young detective who leads the manhunt for Poland's first official serial killer
 Arkadiusz Jakubik as Wiesław Kalicki, a labourer who is forced into signing a confession to being a serial killer
 Agata Kulesza as Lidia Kalicka
 Magdalena Popławska as Teresa Jasińska
 Piotr Adamczyk as Aleksander Stępski
 Karolina Staniec as Anka

Reception 
Deborah Young of The Hollywood Reporter said that the film utilises "quality tech work ... to create a barely colored world of bureaucracy and shadows", describing it as a "classic think piece slipped into an accessible genre".

I'm a Killer has been positively received by critics. The direction of Pieprzyca and the acting of Haniszewski and Jakubik were praised. The film was awarded many times, including the award for directing at the Shanghai International Film Festival and the Silver Lions at the Gdynia Film Festival. At the Polish Film Award I'm a Killer, was nominated in nine categories, but only the supporting roles – Jakubik and Agata Kulesza – received statuettes.

Accolades

References

External links 

2016 crime films
Polish crime films